Hwem is a Swedish netlabel dedicated to drone, noise and avantgarde/experimental music.

The artists on Hwem are: Militant Fields, Sekvens, Martin Herterich, Tsukimono, Dead Letters Spell Out Dead Words, Kaburu and We Were Dancing.

See also
 List of record labels

External links
 Archived Homepage

Swedish record labels
Netlabels
Noise music record labels
Experimental music record labels
Online music stores of Sweden